Don't Quit Your Gay Job is a Canadian reality television series presented by Rob Easton and Sean Horlor and broadcast on OUTtv in Canada, on here! gay television network in the United States  and through OUTtv Netherlands available in most of Europe.

Each half-hour episode of Don't Quit Your Gay Job (DQYGJ) features Easton and Horlor competing to see who can be the most successful at stereotypically "gay" jobs. The first season of the show was broadcast in 2009 (6 episodes) and a second season in 2010 (in 7 episodes) started with a sports series (curling, hockey and professional wrestling) followed by a general set of careers.

In season 3, Horlor has left the show, with Easton in the job solely as host. Tommy Dolanjski, under his stage name Tommy D, and Adam Rollins, have taken over the competition aspect of show, working on the gay jobs, the winner of each episode who is awarded $500. In season 4, Robyn Daye Edwards takes over hosting duties, while the cash award per job has been increased to $1,000.

Episodes

Season 1
 Bus Driver
 Stripper
 Equestrian
 Dominatrix
 Fashion Model
 Drag Queen

Season 2
 Curling
 Hockey
 Police
 Wrestling
 Salon & Spa
 Culinary Arts 
 Gardeners

Season 3
 Lifeguard
 Interior Designer
 Flight Attendant
 Latin Ballroom Dancer
 Firefighter

Season 4
 Lumberjack
 Brewery
 Florist
 Garbage Man
 Food Truck

Awards and nominations
The series received three nominations at the 2011 Leo Awards:
Best information or lifestyle series
Best director for Nicky Forsman
Best hosts for Rob & Sean

It was also voted as the #1 favorite new gay series by here! gay television network in the United States

References

External links
 Don't Quit Your Gay Job page on OUTtv website

2009 Canadian television series debuts
English-language television shows
2000s Canadian reality television series
OutTV (Canadian TV channel) original programming
2000s LGBT-related reality television series
Television shows filmed in Vancouver
2000s Canadian LGBT-related television series
Canadian LGBT-related reality television series